Vadym Oleksandrovych Sosnykhin (10 August 1942 – 28 September 2003) was a Ukrainian football player. After his playing career together with Yevhen Rudakov worked as a children coach at the Dynamo football school.

Honours
 Soviet Top League winner: 1966, 1967, 1968, 1971.
 Soviet Cup winner: 1964, 1966.

International career
Sosnikhin made his debut for the USSR on 16 October 1966 in a friendly against Turkey.

External links
  Profile

1942 births
2003 deaths
Soviet footballers
Soviet Union international footballers
Soviet Top League players
FC Dynamo Kyiv players
Ukrainian footballers
Sportspeople from Kyiv
Association football defenders